Stójków  is a village in the administrative district of Gmina Lądek-Zdrój, within Kłodzko County, Lower Silesian Voivodeship, in south-western Poland. Prior to 1945 it was in Germany.

The village has a population of 199.

On August 20, 1946, the village was destroyed by an extremely intense tornado. The European Severe Storms Laboratory officially rated the tornado F3 on the Fujita scale, however, an academically peer-reviewed, published paper in 2017 rated the tornado F3/F4.

References

Villages in Kłodzko County